Lorcin Engineering Company was a firearms manufacturer established in 1989 by Jim Waldorf. Lorcin produced a series of very inexpensive handguns, which were sold primarily through pawn shops and marketed to people with low income. As such, their guns were frequently referred to as Saturday night specials, and Lorcin was noted by the U.S. Bureau of Alcohol, Tobacco, Firearms and Explosives as one of the Ring of Fire companies, a series of companies established around Los Angeles, California, all of which manufactured inexpensive handguns of similar design and all of which were connected to Raven Arms. Waldorf was a high school friend of Bruce Jennings, founder of Jennings Firearms who was also the son of Raven Arms founder George Jennings.

Lorcin guns were constructed of injection-molded Zamak, a zinc alloy.

In 1993, Lorcin was the number one pistol manufacturer in the United States, producing 341,243 guns. However, in 1996, Lorcin filed for bankruptcy, with 18 pending product liability, personal injury, and wrongful death lawsuits. The company emerged from bankruptcy in 1997, but closed in 1998 with an additional 22 lawsuits having been filed. In 1999, Waldorf established a new company, Standard Arms of Reno, Nevada.

Products 
 L-22: Semi-automatic, .22 LR, 9-shot capacity. A 2001 Bureau of Alcohol, Tobacco, Firearms and Explosives publication warned that the pistol is "extremely dangerous" when dropped, with the "potential for serious injury", due to an insufficient gap between the trigger bar and the sear.
 L-25: Semi-automatic, .25 ACP, 7-shot capacity
 L-32: Semi-automatic, .32 ACP, 7-shot capacity
 L-380: Semi-automatic, .380, 7-shot capacity
 L-9mm: Semi-automatic, 9×19mm Parabellum, 10-shot capacity

See also
 Arcadia Machine & Tool
 Davis Industries
 Jimenez Arms
 Phoenix Arms
 Raven Arms
 Sundance Industries

References

External links
 Interview with Jim Waldorf

1989 establishments in California
1998 disestablishments in California
Companies based in Riverside County, California
Defunct firearms manufacturers
Defunct manufacturing companies based in Greater Los Angeles
Firearm manufacturers of the United States
Manufacturing companies disestablished in 1998
Manufacturing companies established in 1989